From the snow is a Greek drama film directed by Sotiris Goritsas. The film released in 1993 and stars Gerasimos Skiadaresis. The film won the Golden Alexander award in Thessaloniki Film Festival and the Best Movie Award in Greek State Film Awards.

Plot
Few men from South Albania (North Epirus) immigrate to Greece during Albania Crisis. The film follows their travel for a better life in Greece. After crossing the borders on foot, they arrive in Athens with every transport means. There, they face the racism from local society. Some people help them but the difficulties are so many that they decide to return to their village in Albania.

Cast
Gerasimos Skiadaresis
Vasias Eleftheriadis
Mania Papadimitriou

Awards

References

External links

Greek drama films
1993 films